The 1865 United States Senate election in Massachusetts was held during January 1865. Incumbent Republican Senator Henry Wilson was re-elected easily to a second term as a member of the Republican Party.

At the time, Massachusetts elected United States senators by a majority vote of each separate house of the Massachusetts General Court, the House and the Senate.

Background
At the time, the Massachusetts legislature was dominated the Republican Party, whose members held nearly every seat.

Election in the House
On January 10, the House voted for Wilson's re-election and sent the vote to the Senate for ratification.

Election in the Senate
On January 20, the State Senate convened and ratified Wilson's re-election by an overwhelming margin.

References

1865
Massachusetts
United States Senate